Home and hospital education (HHE) is the education of children with medical needs, whether in hospital (with hospital sections or hospital schools) or at home.

The term HHE was first introduced in a proposal for the EU-funded project LeHo (Learning at Home and in the Hospital), an international three-year project funded by the European Union and managed by the Fondazione Politecnico di Milano. LeHo aims to research, develop and disseminate effective pedagogical practices and appropriate use of ICT within the hospital school sector.

See also
Hospital school

References

The LeHo Project (Learning at Home and in the Hospital)

ICT for Home and Hospital Education – based on best practices of the LeHo (Learning at Home and in the Hospital) project 

Special education